Panchuria is a small village in rural Bangladesh under Lohagara Upazila of Narail District.  It is situated at the banks of the Nabaganga River.

This village has a primary school and a secondary school. Besides a madrasa (religious school), there is a market and seven mosques. The population is 100% Muslim, which is unique as surrounding villages are mixed with Hindu-Muslim population.

References

Narail District
Populated places in Khulna Division